The Benjamin Franklin Jones Cottage (also known as Braemar Cottage) is a cottage on the National Register of Historic Places in Cresson Township, Cambria County, Pennsylvania, United States.

In 1990, the mansion was purchased by a group that desired to restore it. In November 2009, a county judge declared the declining property a nuisance and ordered that it be demolished. When the historical group appealed to the Pennsylvania Commonwealth Court, the town supervisors agreed to postpone the demolition until May 2010. A request for a $150,000 grant that the group hoped could fund renovations was rejected.

The structure was saved from demolition in 2011 when it was purchased by a Cresson, Pennsylvania couple who intended to restore it.

See also
 Benjamin Franklin Jones (industrialist)

References 

Houses completed in 1888
Houses in Cambria County, Pennsylvania
Houses on the National Register of Historic Places in Pennsylvania
Queen Anne architecture in Pennsylvania
National Register of Historic Places in Cambria County, Pennsylvania